Golden Grove is a village in Saint John Parish, Antigua and Barbuda.

The Golden Grove Primary School is located in the town.

History

Golden Grove Estate 
According to William Milder's 1669 will, "To my son Jacob Hill, together with 12 or 13 slaves, is half of my Antigua estate named "Paul's," which I just acquired from the widow Elliner [sic] Paull. The other half of my plantation, as well as my moiety of the sloop "Martha" and half of the ship "Charles" of Nevis, were given to my friend John Travers." In the same year, William Mildon of Bristol and Nevis included his farm known as "Paull Plantation" on the island of Antigua in his will. Thomas Ayson of Bristol, England, left his kinsman 50,000 pounds of muscovado sugar from his plantation in Nevis in the same year. Elliner Paull had just lately acquired it, as was mentioned above.

In a petition from William McKinnon in 1698, it was stated that Thomas Trant, a deceased Roman Catholic, was the owner of the Golden Grove Plantation and that William Bridges, Esq. was holding it in trust for him. "By his letter of attorney dated November 1998 appointed Mr. Garret Trant of Montserrat, Mr. David Rice and Mr. Thomas Trant, Jr., of London to sell or let that estate, and two of them accordingly.

Captain John Gamble "seized of certain plantations... one called Golden Grove, and the other the Road Plantation previously Rakes Bay" in 1716 while under indenture to William and Elizabeth Bridges.

For many years, William McKinnon neglected his plantations. In 1773, he went back to Antigua and joined the Council. He was the owner of the 830-acre estates McKinnon's (#10) and Golden Grove.

From from 1801 through 1812, Charles Curtis oversaw the management of this plantation for Samuel Martin. Samuel Martin served as Bertie Entwhistle's trustee after his death in 1803, and as a result, Mr. Curtis was appointed manager of Golden Grove, Barnacle Point (#58), and Jolly Hill (#167). In 1822, Mr. Curtis traveled back to England. He had a box of letters with Samuel Martin that Janet Richards, a distant relative, found. The correspondence included 41 pages of accounting for the Bertie Entwhistle Trust for these estates between 1812 and 1822.

People of color were formerly denied burial space in the churchyard at St. John's Cathedral. The bell, which ordinarily rang to commemorate the passing of plantation owners and their family, "was forbidden to do that service for those degraded ones whose veins flowed the least drop of tarnished blood from Africa." As a result, a smaller bell (which still hangs in the belfry) was purchased from the Golden Grove estate, which was frequently reserved for the use of people of color alone.

When slavery was abolished by the British Parliament in 1833, Golden Grove received a legacy award of £2,363, 5s. 9p. for releasing slaves. Ralph Peters received the only honor.

Flying Horse Hill had a tavern called Flying Horse during World War II. It was situated close to the current Wendy's location. The conflict between Con White SrPub's Allie's and Flying Horse saw a lot of action throughout the conflict. In Allie's Bar, images of Stalin, Churchill, Roosevelt, and Chiang Kai-Shek were prominently displayed. In Golden Grove, where the Antigua State College is currently located, Mr. White also ran a nightclub. In one club, there were "brams," a harsh and inexpensive dance. The land at this location was sold by Flying Horse Hill to the government so that the State College could be built there.

The Antigua Sugar Factory, Ltd. predicted that Golden Grove and Clare Hall (#13b) would yield 2,518 tons of sugar from 2,567 tons of cane delivered at a price of 19.26 cents per ton; 120 acres; and 26 acres with peasants in 1941.

Demographics 
Golden Grove has two enumeration districts.

 13300 Golden Grove School 
 13400 Golden Grove

Census Data (2011)

References 

Saint John Parish, Antigua and Barbuda
Populated places in Antigua and Barbuda